Guy Pnini (Hebrew: גיא פניני) (born September 4, 1983) is an Israeli professional basketball player who currently plays for  Maccabi Playtika Tel Aviv of the Israeli Basketball Premier League and the EuroLeague.

Early life
Pnini is Jewish, and was born in Israel.

Professional career

Maccabi Ra'anana / Bnei Hasharon (2001–2006)
After the 2001 season, Pnini began his professional career, by playing with Maccabi Ra'anana in the Israeli Super League.

Maccabi Rannana merged with Bnei Herzeliya and became Bnei Hasharon. Pnini became the captain of the team in the 2004–05 season, and in 2006, he was chosen to the Israeli Super League's "All Israeli League Team".

At the 2005 Maccabiah Games, Pnini was named tournament MVP as Team Israel won a gold medal in men's basketball.

Hapoel Jerusalem (2006–2008)
In the 2006–07 season, Pnini signed with Hapoel Jerusalem, and with them, he won two Israeli State Cups – one in 2007, after beating his former team, Bnei Hasharon, in the final, and the other in 2008, after beating Maccabi Tel Aviv. In Jerusalem, Pnini became one of the most dominant Israeli players in the league.

Serbia / Cyprus (2008–2009)
Before the 2008–09 season, with one year remaining on his contract with Hapoel Jerusalem, Pnini signed a 3-year contract with Maccabi Tel Aviv, starting from the 2009–10 season. Hapoel Jerusalem appealed against the agreement to the IBA court, claiming that it was an unsportsmanlike situation that their player had a signed contract with their league opponents. The IBA court determined that Pnini had to spend the 2008–09 season playing outside of the Israeli Super League. 

After the verdict, Pnini signed with the Serbian team KK FMP. In January 2009, Pnini left KK FMP, and signed with the Cypriot team Keravnos, where he reached the Cyprus Basketball Division final, where his team lost 3:1 to APOEL Nicosia.

Maccabi Tel Aviv (2009–2017)

After spending a season abroad, Pnini was allowed to fulfill his 3-year contract with Maccabi Tel Aviv, and he joined the team for the 2009–10 season. In December 2012, he was fined NIS 100,000, stripped of his role as the team's captain, and suspended, as the result of a Nazi slur that he used against another player, during a game.

On July 1, 2017, after 8 seasons with the club, Maccabi Tel Aviv have parted ways with Pnini.

Hapoel Holon (2017–2022)
On July 3, 2017, Pnini signed a two-year deal with Hapoel Holon. On February 15, 2018, Pnini recorded 15 points, along with 2 rebounds and 2 assists and helped Holon to win the 2018 Israeli State Cup after an 88–86 win over his former team Maccabi Tel Aviv in the final match, becoming the first player who won the Israeli State Cup with three different teams. On March 1, 2018, Pnini was named Israeli Player of the Month for games played in February.

On January 3, 2019, Pnini signed a two-year contract extension with Hapoel Holon. On April 4, 2019, Pnini was named Israeli Player of the Month after averaging 12.4 points and 5.2 assists, shooting 46 percent from three-point range in four games played in March. On April 12, 2019, Pnini won the three-point shootout during the 2019 Israeli All-Star Event.

Maccabi Tel Aviv (2022–present) 
On June 23, 2022, Pnini signed with Maccabi Tel Aviv of the Israeli Premier League and the EuroLeague.

National team career
Pnini is a member of the Israeli National Team, he participated at the 2007, 2009, 2011, 2013 and 2017 EuroBasket tournaments.

Career statistics

EuroLeague

|-
| style="text-align:left;"| 2009–10
| style="text-align:left;"| Maccabi
| 20 || 11 || 15.2 || .414 || .400 || .680 || 1.8 || .9 || .5 || .1 || 4.7 || 3.1
|-
| style="text-align:left;"| 2010–11
| style="text-align:left;"| Maccabi
| 22 || 5 || 19.8 || .486 || .458 || .778 || 1.7 || 1.1 || .4 || 0 || 7.2 || 6.0
|-
| style="text-align:left;"| 2011–12
| style="text-align:left;"| Maccabi
| 19 || 0 || 12.6 || .367 || .317 || .889 || 1.3 || 1.1 || .4 || .1 || 3.4 || 3.3
|-
| style="text-align:left;"| 2012–13
| style="text-align:left;"| Maccabi
| 23 || 2 || 13.4 || .431 || .302 || .810 || 1.2 || 1 || .3 || .1 || 4.0 || 3.7
|-
| style="text-align:left;background:#AFE6BA;"| 2013–14†
| style="text-align:left;"| Maccabi
| 27 || 20 || 18.4 || .424 || .413 || .583 || 1.8 || 1.8 || .4 || .1 || 5.6 || 5.2
|-
| style="text-align:left;"| 2014–15
| style="text-align:left;"| Maccabi
| 4 || 1 || 20.7 || .565 || .467 || .625 || 2.0 || 1.5 || .8 || .0 || 9.5 || 7.5
|-
| style="text-align:left;"| 2015–16
| style="text-align:left;"| Maccabi
| 10 || 2 || 15.4 || .500 || .467 || .833 || 1.1 || 1.0 || .4 || .0 || 5.3 || 4.6
|-
| style="text-align:left;"| 2016–17
| style="text-align:left;"| Maccabi
| 29 || 1 || 12.4 || .519 || .277 || .533 || 1.6 || 1.2 || .3 || .0 || 2.6 || 3.1
|- class="sortbottom"
| style="text-align:left;"| Career
| style="text-align:left;"|
| 115 || 39 || 16.3 || .438 || .396 || .719 || 1.6 || 1.2 || .4 || .1 || 5.2 || 4.5

References

External links

Guy Pnini at basket.co.il
Guy Pnini at fiba.com
Guy Pnini at eurobasket.com
Guy Pnini at euroleague.net

1983 births
Living people
ABA League players
Basketball League of Serbia players
Bnei HaSharon players
Competitors at the 2005 Maccabiah Games
Hapoel Holon players
Hapoel Jerusalem B.C. players
Israeli Basketball Premier League players
Israeli expatriate sportspeople in Cyprus
Israeli Jews
Israeli men's basketball players
Israeli expatriate basketball people in Serbia
Jewish men's basketball players
Keravnos B.C. players
KK FMP (1991–2011) players
Maccabiah Games basketball players of Israel
Maccabiah Games gold medalists for Israel
Maccabiah Games medalists in basketball
Maccabi Tel Aviv B.C. players
Small forwards
Sportspeople from Tel Aviv